Giorgia Moll (born 14 January 1938) is an Italian film actress. She was sometimes credited as Georgia Moll and Georgia Mool.

Background 
Moll was born in Prata di Pordenone to a German father and an Italian mother. At a young age, she began a brief career as a model and in 1955 she won the "Miss Cinema" beauty contest. The following year she started her film career, being mainly active in comedies and adventure films. She was critically appreciated for her dramatic performance in Damiano Damiani's Lipstick (1960). Moll retired from acting in the early 1970s.

Selected filmography
 1956: Lo svitato by Carlo Lizzani : Elena
 1956: Nero's Weekend by Steno : Lidia
 1956: Women's Club by Ralph Habib : Gina
 1957: Husbands in the City by Luigi Comencini : Lionella
 1958: Mogli pericolose by Luigi Comencini : Claudina Carpi
 1958: The Quiet American by Joseph L. Mankiewicz : Phuong
 1959: Wild Cats on the Beach by Vittorio Sala : Adelina
 1959: La cambiale by Camillo Mastrocinque : Maria
 1959: The White Warrior by Riccardo Freda : Saltanet
 1959: Tunis Top Secret by Bruno Paolinelli : Simone Fredrick
 1960: The Cossacks by Giorgio Rivalta and Viktor Tourjansky : Tatiana
 1960: Lipstick by Damiano Damiani: Lorella Severano 
 1960: Colossus and the Amazon Queen by Vittorio Sala : an Amazon
 1961: The Thief of Bagdad by Arthur Lubin and Bruno Vailati : Amina
 1961: Romulus and the Sabines by Richard Pottier : Lavinia
 1963: Contempt by Jean-Luc Godard : Francesca Vanini, assistant producer
 1963 : Island of Love by Morton DaCosta : Elena Harakas
 1964: Dark Purpose by George Marshall : Cora Barbarelli
 1966: Incompreso by Luigi Comencini : Aristocrat's wife 
 1966: The Devil in Love by Ettore Scola
 1967: The Blonde from Peking by Nicolas Gessner : Jinny
 1967: Tom Dollar by Marcello Ciorciolini : Samia
 1967: I barbieri di Sicilia by Marcello Ciorciolini : Helga Von Krauss
 1968: Captain Singrid by Jean Leduc : Carol
 1968: Italian Secret Service by Luigi Comencini : The Bird
 1968:  by Helmut Förnbacher : Brigitte
 1969: Le Voleur de crimes by Nadine Trintignant : Olga
 1984: Everybody in Jail by Alberto Sordi : Giovanna Salvemini

References

External links

1938 births
Living people
People from the Province of Pordenone
Italian film actresses
Italian beauty pageant winners
Italian people of German descent